Pär Anders Fridén (born 25 March 1973) is a Swedish vocalist, best known as the lead singer of heavy metal band In Flames. He was also the vocalist of Dark Tranquillity and Passenger, a side project.

Career

Early career
Fridén was originally the vocalist for Dark Tranquillity. He performed on their debut album, Skydancer, but left the band soon after. Two years later he joined In Flames. Coincidentally Mikael Stanne had left In Flames (being only a session player) and switched from rhythm guitar to lead vocals in Dark Tranquillity, so the two effectively traded places. Fridén was also the lead vocalist for another band known as Ceremonial Oath with In Flames founder Jesper Strömblad.

1995–present: In Flames 
Fridén started with In Flames on the 1996 album The Jester Race. On the album Whoracle, Niklas Sundin (of Dark Tranquillity) wrote the lyrics following the original synopsis by Fridén. On the 1999 album Colony, Fridén composed the lyrics himself, though Sundin still assisted by translating his lyrics from Swedish to English.

He is also the vocalist for the band Passenger as a side project.

Fridén also has done guest vocals on the album The Phantom Novels, by the metal band Grievance. He is the lead vocalist on the tracks Atrocity Upon Deceptions, A Devil's Rhyme and The Mask of Sin.

In 2007 Fridén appeared as a guest vocalist on the Japanese bonus track "See the Falling Sky" on Caliban's 2007 album "The Awakening". As well as providing vocals for the track "Dysfunctional Hours" for the 20th anniversary Nuclear Blast Allstars compilation album, Out of the Dark.

His look changed dramatically following the release of In Flames 2002 release Reroute to Remain. His previously clean-shaven look was replaced with a beard, and his long hair was put into dreadlocks. His vocal style has also changed, especially on the past three records.  His low-tone, harsh death growl has evolved into a higher pitched scream, which is now supplemented by clean vocals and layers of backing vocals.

In addition to being a vocalist, Fridén is also a producer, with his most recent efforts being the albums: The Undying Darkness by Caliban in 2006 and Absolute Design by the band Engel in 2007.

He also co-wrote and performed scream vocals on the song "Self vs Self", which appears on the third album of UK/Australian drum and bass band Pendulum alongside his bandmates Björn Gelotte and Peter Iwers.

In the summer of 2010, Fridén changed his appearance again by cutting off his dreadlocks, which he had grown since the release of Reroute to Remain.

Fridén founded the ambient/electronic project If Anything, Suspicious in 2021. The project's debut album, Lullabies for the Damned, was released in collaboration with OFFAIR in December 2021.

Discography

References

External links

1973 births
Death metal musicians
Swedish heavy metal drummers
People from Gothenburg
Swedish heavy metal singers
Swedish drummers
Male drummers
Living people
English-language singers from Sweden
21st-century Swedish singers
21st-century drummers
21st-century Swedish male singers
In Flames members
Passenger (Swedish band) members
Dark Tranquillity members
Ceremonial Oath members